Margaret Pattison Staples-Browne (née Thom, 20 October 1873 –16 April 1930), more commonly known as Mākereti or Maggie Papakura, was a New Zealand guide, entertainer and ethnographer. Of Pākehā and Māori descent, she was of Te Arawa and Tūhourangi iwi.

Early life
Papakura was born in Matatā, Bay of Plenty, New Zealand, in 1873. Her parents were Englishman William Arthur Thom, a storekeeper, and Pia Ngarotū Te Rihi, a high-born Te Arawa woman of Ngāti Wāhiao hapu of Tūhourangi, descended from Te Arawa chiefs Tama-te-kapua, Ngātoroirangi, Hei and Ika.

Papakura was raised until the age of 10 by her mother's aunt and uncle, Mārara Marotaua and Maihi Te Kakau Parāoa, at the small rural village of Parekārangi, where she spoke Māori and learnt her maternal family's history, culture and traditions. When she was 10, her father took over her education and she attended schools in Rotorua and Tauranga, then Hukarere Native School for Girls in Napier.

In 1891, aged 18, she married Francis (Frank) Dennan, a surveyor, and had a son, William Francis (Te Aonui) Dennan, later that year. The family lived briefly in the Wairarapa, but Dennan left to work in Taupō and Papakura returned to Whakarewarewa. They divorced in 1900.

Adult life 
After secondary school, Papakura moved to live in the thermal springs area of Whakarewarewa in Rotorua and began to learn to be a guide under Guide Sophia Hinerangi. With her wages she was able to support her infant son, William. She was once asked by an overseas visitor if she had a Māori surname, and, glancing around for inspiration. she saw the geyser Papakura nearby and told the visitor her name was Maggie Papakura. From then on, she worked under the name and members of her family also adopted the new surname.

In 1901, Papakura was the guide for the Duke and Duchess of Cornwall and York (later King George VI and Queen Elizabeth The Queen Mother) on their visit to Whakarewarewa. She was noticed by the press, and as a result, she was featured in magazines, calendars, brochures, books, postcards and newspaper society columns. Two years later she published her own guide book, Maggie's Guide to the Hot Lakes, which was a great success.

Papakura was also a skilled entertainer and in the early 1900s established the Rotorua Maori Choir, which she took to Sydney on tour in 1910. The tour was so successful that a group of Sydney businesspeople asked her to organise a concert party to go to London for the Festival of Empire celebrations, and in April 1911 Papakura's group left for England. The group consisted of around 40 members of Papakura's family, including her sister Bella, brother Dick and Tūhourangi leader Mita Taupopoki.

They group performed at Crystal Palace, the Palace Theatre and White City and were accompanied by an exhibition of Māori artefacts, including a meeting house and storehouse. The tour was highly successful in terms of positive publicity and attention, however it was beset by financial problems. About half the group decided to stay in England, and four of the women married Englishmen. The remainder of the group returned to New Zealand in late 1911. Papakura was blamed both for the financial issues and for the group members who had not come back. She stayed in New Zealand only briefly and she then returned to England, where she continued a relationship with Richard Staples-Browne. She had first met him in 1907 when he had toured New Zealand. The couple were married in 1912 and they lived in Staples-Browne's country home in Oxfordshire, Oddington Grange.

During World War I, Papakura and her husband opened their homes in Oxfordshire and London to injured New Zealand troops, and Papakura installed a memorial to fallen Australian and New Zealand Army Corps soldiers in the chapel at Oddington. In 1924, Papakura moved into Oxford and enrolled to study a Bachelor of Science degree in anthropology at the Society of Oxford Home-Students. She wrote a thesis on Māori culture, which she took to the elders at Whakarewarewa for approval before submitting it. Papakura died suddenly three weeks before her thesis examination, on 16 April 1930 aged 56, from a ruptured aortic artery.  She was buried, according to her wishes, in Oddington cemetery; her family in Whakarewarewa erected a memorial to her in the village the following year.

Legacy 
Papakura's thesis was published posthumously in 1938 by her friend and fellow Oxford anthropology student Thomas Kenneth Penniman as The Old-Time Maori. It describes and analyses the customs of Te Arawa from a woman's perspective, including aspects of daily life such as child-rearing and family relationships, which had previously been ignored by male writers. Papakura also corrected the erroneous assumptions of Pakeha ethnologists in her work, which was the first extensive published ethnographic work by a Māori scholar. The book was re-printed in 1986 by New Women's Press.

In 1993 works owned and created by Papakura formed part of the exhibition Ngā puna roimata o Te Arawa held at Te Papa that also featured works by Te Hikapuhi Wiremu Poihipi and Rangimahora Reihana-Mete.

In 2007, a biography of Papakura was published by Paul Diamond, Makereti: Taking Maori to the World, and she was the subject of an exhibition at the National Library of New Zealand.

Papakura's house, named after her ancestor Tuhoromatakaka and built by master carver Tene Waitere, still stands in the village at Whakarewarewa.

In 2017, Papakura was selected as one of the Royal Society Te Apārangi's "150 women in 150 words", celebrating the contributions of women to knowledge in New Zealand.

A collection of Maori artefacts owned by Mākereti were donated to the Pitt Rivers Museum, along with her collection of photographs, genealogies and notes for her thesis, by her son William Francis Dennan, following her death.

References

1873 births
1930 deaths
People from the Bay of Plenty Region
Ethnographers
Tuhourangi people
Te Arawa people
People educated at Hukarere Girls' College
Alumni of the University of Oxford
New Zealand Māori writers
20th-century New Zealand women writers
20th-century New Zealand writers
New Zealand women anthropologists
Māori and Pacific Island scientists
People associated with the Pitt Rivers Museum